Michael Kauter (born February 18, 1979 in Bern) is a Swiss épée fencer. He won a bronze medal in the weapon at the 2008 European Fencing Championships in Kiev, Ukraine. He is the son of Christian Kauter, a medalist at the 1972 Summer Olympics in Munich and at the 1976 Summer Olympics in Montreal in épée, and the brother of Fabian Kauter, an Olympic fencer in the same weapon.

Kauter represented Switzerland at the 2008 Summer Olympics in Beijing, where he competed in the men's individual épée event. He defeated Ukraine's Bohdan Nikishyn in the preliminary round of thirty-two, before losing his next match to Netherlands' Bas Verwijlen, with a score of 13–15.

References

External links 

Profile – FIE
NBC 2008 Olympics profile

1979 births
Living people
Olympic fencers of Switzerland
Fencers at the 2008 Summer Olympics
Sportspeople from Bern
Swiss male épée fencers
20th-century Swiss people
21st-century Swiss people